Arney is an unincorporated community in eastern Jefferson Township, Owen County, in the U.S. state of Indiana.  It lies near the intersection of County Road 880 West (a.k.a. Stubenville Road) and County Road 500 South (a.k.a. Arney Road), which is a community nearly ten miles southwest of the city of Spencer, the county seat of Owen County.  Its elevation is 705 feet (215 m), and it is located at  (39.2186546, -86.9316754).

History
Arney was founded in 1852. A post office was established at Arney in 1856, and remained in operation until it was discontinued in 1912.

School district
Arney students may attend Spencer-Owen Community Schools, including a high school.

Political districts
 State House District 46
 State Senate District 39

References

External links
   Roadside Thoughts for Arney, Indiana

Unincorporated communities in Owen County, Indiana
1852 establishments in Indiana
Unincorporated communities in Indiana